Eburodacrys pinima is a species of beetle in the family Cerambycidae. It was described by Martins in 1999.

References

Eburodacrys
Beetles described in 1999